José A.F.O. Correia (born 18 July 1984) is a Portuguese researcher, professor and engineer.

Biography
José A.F.O. Correia, also known as José António Correia, is a researcher in fatigue, structural integrity and fracture mechanics at the University of Porto of Porto, Portugal, since 2019. He is invited professor at the University of Coimbra, Portugal, since 2016. He is also guest teacher at the Delft University of Technology, Netherlands.
In 2007, José A.F.O. Correia is graduated in Civil Engineering at the University of Trás-os-Montes and Alto Douro (Portugal). In 2009, he obtained the Master Science in Civil Engineering in the Structural Mechanics area at the University of Trás-os-Montes and Alto Douro (Portugal). He is also a specialist in steel and mixed constructions by the University of Coimbra, Portugal (2010). After that, he completed his Ph.D. in Civil Engineering – Structures at the University of Porto (Portugal), in 2015.

He is chairman of the technical committees ESIS TC12 on Risk Analysis and Safety of Large Structures and Components  and ESIS TC03 on Fatigue of Engineering Materials and Structures, 2017 and 2020, respectively, of European Structural Integrity Society.

He is Editor-in-chief or Editor and member of the editorial board of several scientific journals and book series, such as:
Editor-in-Chief of the Structural Integrity book series
Editor-in-Chief of the Smart Infrastructure and Construction 
Editor-in-Chief of the International Journal of Ocean Systems Management 
Section Editor-in-Chief of the Modelling of Engineering Structures section of the Modelling MDPI journal 
Member of the editorial board of the International Journal of Fatigue

References

Living people
1984 births
Portuguese engineers